Marcelo Arévalo and Jean-Julien Rojer won the men's doubles tennis title at the 2023 Adelaide International 2 after Ivan Dodig and Austin Krajicek withdrew from the final due to Dodig's injury. Arévalo and Rojer received walkovers in the last two rounds.

Wesley Koolhof and Neal Skupski were the defending champions, but lost in the semifinals to Dodig and Krajicek. Koolhof and Skupski will thus lose the joint ATP no. 1 doubles ranking to Rajeev Ram at the end of the tournament, despite Ram not competing this week.

Seeds
All seeds received a bye into the second round.

Draw

Finals

Top half

Bottom half

References

External links
Main draw

Adelaide International 2 - Doubles
2023 Men's Doubles 2
Adelaide